Duns Scotus College was a private college of the Friars Minor in Southfield, Michigan from 1930 until 1979.  It was first regularly accredited in 1969.

It was founded when the Friars decided their previous three-seminary set up in Kentucky and Ohio was too unwieldy.  In 1928 ground was broken for the college at the corner of Nine Mile Road and Evergreen Road in Southfield.  It was designed by Wilfrid B. Anthony.

After closing, the college became Word of Faith Christian Center, led by Keith Butler.

External links 

 History of Duns Scotus College

Sources

Roman Catholic Archdiocese of Detroit
Defunct private universities and colleges in Michigan
1930 establishments in Michigan
1979 disestablishments in Michigan